This table displays the top-rated primetime television series of the 2005–06 season as measured by Nielsen Media Research.

References

2005 in American television
2006 in American television
2005-related lists
2006-related lists
Lists of American television series